Ken Skowronski (born May 31, 1938) is an American general contractor and Republican politician from Milwaukee County, Wisconsin.  He is a former member of the Wisconsin State Assembly, representing the 82nd assembly district from January 2014 through 2022.

Biography
Born in Milwaukee, Skowronski graduated from Boys Tech High School in 1958 and was certified as a journeyman carpenter in 1961, after attending Milwaukee Area Technical College. He worked for 58 years in the construction and remodeling industry as a general contractor.

Skowronski served in the Wisconsin Air National Guard with the 128th Air Refueling Wing. Additionally, he is a member of the Knights of Columbus and Ducks Unlimited. He is the current President of the Polish Heritage Alliance of Wisconsin.

Political career
Skowronski was elected to the Assembly in 2013 in a special election following the resignation of Jeff Stone. Previously, he was elected as an alderman of Franklin in 2005 and re-elected in 2008 and 2011.

References

External links
 
 
 Official website

People from Franklin, Milwaukee County, Wisconsin
Republican Party members of the Wisconsin State Assembly
Wisconsin city council members
Military personnel from Wisconsin
United States Air Force airmen
Living people
American politicians of Polish descent
21st-century American politicians
1938 births